Batangas Racing Circuit is a permanent circuit in Barrio Maligaya, Rosario, Batangas, Philippines built in October 16, 1996.

It hosts 2- and 4-wheeled races such as Formula Toyota, Toyota Corolla Cup, National Touring Car Championship, Circuit Showdown, FlatOut Race Series, Philippine GT, and the Philippine Superbike Championship. The layout also features a drag strip that is used by the National Drag Racing Championship.

References

External links 
Circuit Map and info
Racetrack Info by AutoIndustriya.com

Motorsport venues in the Philippines
Buildings and structures in Batangas
Sports in Batangas